Posht Par Rural District is a rural district (dehestan) in Simakan District, Jahrom County, Fars Province, Iran. At the 2006 census, its population was 5,227, in 1,267 families.  The rural district has 16 villages.

References 

Rural Districts of Fars Province
Jahrom County